Richard Preddy (3 September 1966 – 7 July 2020) was a British comedy writer and performer, most noted for working in the sketch show Smack the Pony and the sitcom Green Wing. He had a working partnership with fellow writer Gary Howe since 1987.

Performer 

All Aboard The Cat Bus on Channel 4's Comedy Lab - (1999)
House Of Rock - (2000-02)

Producer 

Tommy the Tungsten Robot - (2008)

Writer 

ChuckleVision - (1987-2009)
Birds Of A Feather - (1989-98)
Smith and Jones - (1989-98)
Tracey Ullman: A Class Act - (1993)
Harry Enfield And Chums - (1994-97)
The Fast Show - (1994-2000)
Ant and Dec Unzipped - (1997)
Sunnyside Farm - (1997)
We Know Where You Live - (1997)
The Morwenna Banks Show - (1998)
The Zig and Zag Show - (1998)
All Aboard The Cat Bus on Channel 4's Comedy Lab - (1999)
Smack the Pony - (1999-2003)
House Of Rock - (2000-02)
Tv to Go - (2000-02)
Green Wing - (2004-2007)
The All Star Comedy Show, later Monkey Trousers - (2004-05)
Man Stroke Woman - (2005-Present)
Stupid - (2005-Present)
Campus - (2009-2011)
Rastamouse - (2012) (segment "Book Ah Records")
Gates - (2012)
Angry Birds Toons - (2013-2016)
Trollied - (2013)
The Amazing World of Gumball - (2015) (segment "The Crew")
Bottersnikes and Gumbles - (2016)
Space Chickens in Space - (2018-Present)

External links 
Richard Preddy in BBC Comedy Guide
Green Wing "microsite" at Channel4.com
British Sitcom Guide Green Wing writers.

British comedy writers
Living people
Year of birth missing (living people)